The 2003–04 season of the Slovak Second Football League (also known as 2. liga) was the eleventh season of the league since its establishment. It began on 19 July 2003 and ended on 5 June 2004.

League standing

See also
2003–04 Slovak Superliga

External links
 Tables and results at www.liga.cz

2. Liga (Slovakia) seasons
2003–04 in Slovak football
Slovak